Dumman or Dhuman is a village located on Jehlum road and union council, an administrative subdivision, of Chakwal District in the Punjab Province of Pakistan. It is part of Chakwal Tehsil. The village also houses a small hospital and a police station to look after the local population.

Primarily a Hindu majority area in pre-partition times, it still has an old Hindu temple on its hilltop. Also located in it is a Rest house Banglow from Raj era. It also has a Livestock Hospital. GPO (General Post Office). It has Govt schools for both boys and girls.

A village named Arrar is located south of Dumman.

References

Union councils of Chakwal District
Populated places in Chakwal District